Mirjami Kuosmanen (22 February 1915 – 5 August 1963) was a Finnish actress. She appeared in 24 films between 1937 and 1956. She was married to filmmaker Erik Blomberg. In 1952, she won the Jussi Award for Best Actress for her role in The White Reindeer

Kuosmanen died suddenly from a brain hemorrhage at the age of 48.

Selected filmography
 The Song of the Scarlet Flower (1938)
 Golden Light (1946)
 Life in the Finnish Woods (1947)
 The White Reindeer (1952)

References

External links

1915 births
1963 deaths
People from Keuruu
People from Vaasa Province (Grand Duchy of Finland)
Finnish film actresses
20th-century Finnish actresses